Bichiktu-Boom (Biçiktü-Boom) is a rural locality (a selo) in Ongudaysky District, the Altai Republic, Russia. The population was 241 as of 2016. There are 6 streets.

Geography 
Bichiktu-Boom is located 20 km northwest of Onguday (the district's administrative centre) by road. Karakol is the nearest rural locality.

References 

Rural localities in Ongudaysky District